The Strawn Historic Sawmill District is a U.S. historic district (designated as such on September 13, 1993) located in DeLeon Springs, Florida. The district is at 5710 Lake Winona Road. It contains 3 historic buildings.

References

External links

 Volusia County listings at National Register of Historic Places

National Register of Historic Places in Volusia County, Florida
Historic districts on the National Register of Historic Places in Florida